A Guy Like Me (Un muchacho como yo) is a 1968 Argentine film directed by Enrique Carreras and written by Ariel Cortazzo. It's a remake of Ritmo, amor y picardía (1953), also by Carreras. It stars Palito Ortega, Soledad Silveyra, Osvaldo Miranda, Beatriz Bonnet, and Javier Portales.

It was released in Argentina on 14 March 1968.

Cast

References

External links
 

1968 films
Argentine musical comedy films
1960s Spanish-language films
1960s Argentine films
Films directed by Enrique Carreras